Abdul Wahid Khan Durrani (born 30 June 1917 in Quetta, Balochistan, British India - died 24 February 2008) was a former Pakistani international footballer.

Durrani played in Pakistan's first international in 1950, in a match against Iran. He later became captain of the Pakistan national football team and in his career he scored 4 international goals in 11 games.

Personal life
Abdul Wahid Khan Durrani had 4 children: Abida Mushtaq, Sadia Kazmi, Abdul Latif Khan Durrani, and Sami Khan Durrani.

References

External links
 Abdul Wahid Durrani helps Hindu's safely out of Pakistan during 1947 independence.

Pakistani footballers
Pashtun people
People from Quetta
1917 births
2008 deaths
Association football forwards
Pakistan international footballers